Ebeyty is a salt lake in Omsk Oblast, Russian Federation.

Ebeyty lies at the tripoint of Moskalensky, Poltavsky and Isilkulsky districts. The waters of the lake are reputed to have healing properties.

Geography
Ebeyty lies in the southern part of the Ishim Plain, the southernmost sector of the West Siberian Plain. It is a saline endorheic lake located at the bottom of a depression. Ebeyty is the largest salt lake in Omsk Oblast.

The bottom of the lake is muddy. Ebeyty is mainly fed by snow.

Flora
The Ebeyty basin lies in the transition area between forest-steppe and steppe vegetation. Owing to the high salinity, halophytic plant species dominate.

See also
List of lakes of Russia

References

External links
Peculiarities lake Ebeyty of salt accumulation in the Omsk region 
Ecological and tourist trail on Lake Ebeyty

Lakes of Russia
Endorheic lakes of Asia
Omsk Oblast
West Siberian Plain